Kellogg is an unincorporated community in Sonoma County, California, United States.

References

Unincorporated communities in California
Unincorporated communities in Sonoma County, California